The Ludhiana–Dhuri–Jakhal line is a railway line connecting  in the Indian state of the Punjab and  in Haryana. The line is under the administrative jurisdiction of Northern Railway.

History
In 1893, an agreement for the construction, working and  maintenance of the broad-gauge Ludhiana–Dhuri–Jakhal railway line, via Sangrur, was signed between the British Raj and the native principalities of Jind State, Malerkotla State and Patiala State, since the line was situated partly in British territory and partly in the territory lying in the native principalities. in 1901, this new line was commissioned, possibly by the Southern Punjab Railway Co.

Electrification
Electrification of the Jakhal–Ludhiana line was ordered in 2013 but the work has started in March 2016 from Ludhiana side and foundation stone was laid at Gill. CRS Trial has been successfully conducted up to Dhuri Jn. from Ludhiana Jn. in 2019. The electrification of 62 km-long stretch of Dhuri to Jakhal on Ludhiana–Jakhal line was completed and trial runs were successfully carried out in July 2020.

Tracks
Detailed survey for the doubling of the Ludhiana–Sangrur–Jakhal line has been ordered.

Railway reorganisation
Southern Punjab Railway was taken over by the state and merged with North Western Railway in 1930.

With the partition of India in 1947, North Western Railway was split. While the western portion became Pakistan West Railway, and later Pakistan Railways, the eastern part became Eastern Punjab Railway.

In 1952, Northern Railway was formed with a portion of East Indian Railway Company, west of Mughalsarai, Bikaner Railway and Eastern Punjab Railway.

References

External links
Trains at Ludhiana 
Trains at Jakhal
 Trains from Ludhiana to Jakhal

5 ft 6 in gauge railways in India
Rail transport in Haryana
Rail transport in Punjab, India

Railway lines opened in 1901
1901 establishments in India